or  is an illustrated horizontal narration system of painted handscrolls that dates back to Nara-period (710–794 CE) Japan. Initially copying their much older Chinese counterparts in style, during the succeeding Heian (794–1185) and Kamakura periods (1185–1333), Japanese  developed their own distinct style. The term therefore refers only to Japanese painted narrative scrolls.

As in the Chinese and Korean scrolls,  combine calligraphy and illustrations and are painted, drawn or stamped on long rolls of paper or silk sometimes measuring several metres. The reader unwinds each scroll little by little, revealing the story as seen fit.  are therefore a narrative genre similar to the book, developing romantic or epic stories, or illustrating religious texts and legends. Fully anchored in the  style, these Japanese works are above all an everyday art, centered on the human being and the sensations conveyed by the artist.

Although the very first 8th-century  were copies of Chinese works,  of Japanese taste appeared from the 10th century in the Heian imperial court, especially among aristocratic ladies with refined and reclusive lives, who devoted themselves to the arts, poetry, painting, calligraphy and literature. During this period, the techniques of composition became highly accomplished, and the subjects were even more varied than before, dealing with history, religion, romances, and other famous tales. The patrons who sponsored the creation of these  were above all the aristocrats and Buddhist temples. From the 14th century, the  genre became more marginal, giving way to new movements born mainly from Zen Buddhism.

 paintings mostly belong to the  style, characterized by its subjects from Japanese life and landscapes, the staging of the human, and an emphasis on rich colours and a decorative appearance. In general, there are thus two main categories of : those which alternate the calligraphy and the image, each new painting illustrating the preceding text, and those which present continuous paintings, not interrupted by the text, where various technical measures allow the fluid transitions between the scenes.

Today,  offer a unique historical glimpse into the life and customs of Japanese people, of all social classes and all ages, during the early part of medieval times. Few of the scrolls have survived intact, and around 20 are protected as National Treasures of Japan.

Concept

The scrolls tell a story or a succession of anecdotes (such as literary chronicles or Buddhist parables), combining pictorial and narrative elements, the combination of which characterises the dominant art movements in Japan between the 12th and 14th centuries.

An  is read, according to the traditional method, sitting on a mat with the scroll placed on a low table or on the floor. The reader then unwinds with one hand while rewinding it with the other hand, from right to left (according to the writing direction of Japanese).

Once the  has been read, the reader must rewind the scroll again in its original reading direction. The  is kept closed by a cord and stored alone or with other rolls in a box intended for this purpose, and which is sometimes decorated with elaborate patterns.

History

Origins
Handscrolls are believed to have been invented in India before the 4th century CE. They were used for religious texts and entered China by the 1st century. Handscrolls were introduced to Japan centuries later through the spread of Buddhism. The earliest extant Japanese handscroll was created in the 8th century and focuses on the life of the Buddha.

The origins of Japanese handscrolls can be found in China and, to a lesser extent, in Korea, the main sources of Japanese artistic inspiration until modern times. Narrative art forms in China can be traced back to between the 3rd century CE under the Han dynasty and the 2nd century CE under the Zhou dynasty, the pottery of which was adorned with hunting scenes juxtaposed with movements. Paper was invented in China in about the 1st century CE, simplifying the writing on scrolls of laws or sutra, sometimes decorated. The first narrative scrolls arrived later; various masters showed interest in this medium, including Gu Kaizhi (345–406), who experimented with new techniques. Genre painting and Chinese characters, dominant in the scrolls up to the 10th century CE, remain little known to this day, because they were overshadowed by the famous landscape scrolls of the Song dynasty.

Relations with East Asia (mainly China and Korea) brought Chinese writing (kanji) to Japan by the 4th century, and Buddhism in the 6th century, together with interest in the apparently very effective bureaucracy of the mighty Chinese Empire. In the Nara period, the Japanese were inspired by the Tang dynasty: administration, architecture, dress customs or ceremonies. The exchanges between China and Japan were also fruitful for the arts, mainly religious arts, and the artists of the Japanese archipelago were eager to copy and appropriate continental techniques. In that context, experts assume that the first Chinese painted scrolls arrived on the islands around the 6th century CE, and probably correspond to illustrated sutra. Still naive in style (Six Dynasties and early Tang dynasty) with the paintings arranged in friezes above the text, it is very likely a copy of an older Chinese model, several versions of which have been identified. Although subsequent classical  feature a very different style from that of this work, it foreshadows the golden age of the movement that came four centuries later, from the 12th century CE onwards.

Heian period: genesis of the art

Arts and literature, birth of a national aesthetic

The Heian period appears today as a peak of Japanese civilization via the culture of the emperor's court, although intrigue and disinterest in things of the state resulted in the Genpei War. Furthermore, the rupture of relations with China until the 9th century, due to disorders related to the collapse of the glorious Tang dynasty, promoted what Miyeko Murase has described as the "emergence of national taste" as a truly Japanese culture departed for the first time from Chinese influence since the early Kofun period. This development was first observed in the literature of the Heian women: unlike the men, who studied Chinese writing from a young age, the women adopted a new syllabary, which was simpler and more consistent with the phonetics of Japanese. Heian period novels and diaries recorded intimate details about life, love affairs and intrigues at court as they developed; the best known of these is the radical Tale of Genji by Murasaki Shikibu, lady-in-waiting of the 10th century Imperial Court.

The beginnings of the Japanese-inspired Heian period painting technique, retrospectively named , can be found initially in some aspects of Buddhist painting of the new esoteric Tendai and Shingon sects, then more strongly in Pure Land Buddhism; after a phase when Chinese techniques were copied, the art of the Japanese archipelago became progressively more delicate, lyrical, decorative with less powerful but more colorful compositions. Nevertheless, it was especially in secular art that the nascent  was felt most strongly; its origins went back to the sliding partitions and screens of the Heian Imperial Palace, covered with paintings on paper or silk, the themes of which were chosen from  court poetry, annual rites, seasons or the famous lives and landscapes of the archipelago.

This secular art then spread among the nobles, especially the ladies interested in the illustration of novels, and seems to have become prevalent early in the 10th century.

The painting technique lent itself fully to the artistic tastes of the court in the 11th century, inclined to an emotional, melancholic and refined representation of relations within the palace, and formed a pictorial vector very suited to the narrative.

However, the stylistic mastery of later works (from the 12th century) leads most experts to believe that the "classical" art of  grew during this period from the 10th century, first appearing in illustrations in novels or diaries produced by the ladies of the court. In addition, the initial themes remained close to  poetry (seasons, Buddhism, nature and other themes). The art historians consider that the composition and painting techniques they see in the masterpieces of the late Heian period (second half of the 12th century) were already very mature.

Fujiwara era: classical masterpieces
Several classic scrolls of each genre perfectly represent these pictorial movements.

In that scroll, each painting illustrates a key episode of the novel and is followed by a calligraphic extract on paper richly decorated with gold and silver powder.

The  already presents the composition techniques specific to the art of : an oblique point of view, the movement of the eyes guided by long diagonals from the top right to the bottom left, and even the removal of the roofs to represent the interior of buildings.

In contrast with court paintings inspired by women's novels there are other scrolls inspired by themes such as the daily lives of the people, historical chronicles, and the biographies of famous monks; ultimately, a style of  depicting matters outside the palace and called  ("men's painting").

The  (middle of the 12th century), with dynamic and free lines, light colors and a decidedly popular and humorous tone, perfectly illustrate this movement, not hesitating to depict the life of the Japanese people in its most insignificant details. Here, the color is applied only in light touches that leave the paper bare, as the supple and free line dominates the composition, unlike the constructed paintings of the court. In addition, the text occupies very limited space, the artist painting rather long scenes without fixed limits.

Two other masterpieces emerged into the light of day during the second half of the 12th century.

First, the  forms a monochrome sketch in ink gently caricaturing the customs of Buddhist monks, where the spontaneity of touch stands out.

While the authority of the court rapidly declined, the end of the Heian period (in 1185) was marked by the advent of the provincial lords (in particular, the Taira and the Minamoto), who acquired great power at the top of the state.

Retracing the evolution of  remains difficult, due to the few works that have survived. However, the obvious mastery of the classical scrolls of the end of the Heian period testifies to at least a century of maturation and pictorial research. These foundations permitted the  artists of the ensuing Kamakura period to engage in sustained production in all of the themes.

Kamakura period: the golden age of 

Under the impetus of the new warrior class in power, and the new Buddhist sects, production was indeed very sustained and the themes and techniques more varied than before.

For example, the  recounts the life and death of Sugawara no Michizane, Minister in the 9th century and tragic figure in Japanese history, revered in the manner of a god. The rich colours, the tense contours, the search for movement and the very realistic details of the faces well illustrate this mixture of styles, especially as the paintings drew their inspiration from both Buddhism and Shinto.

The realistic trends that were in vogue in Kamakura art, perfectly embodied by sculpture, were exposed in the majority of the Kamakura ; indeed, the  shogunate system held power over Japan, and the refined and codified art of the court gave way to more fluidity and dynamism. The greater simplicity advocated in the arts led to a more realistic and human representation (anger, pain or size). Akiyama Terukazu describes it as "a masterpiece on the subject of the world's military." In the same spirit, a noble warrior had the  designed to recount his military exploits during the Mongol invasions of Japan.

A similar change was felt in religion as the esoteric Buddhist sects of the Heian era (Tendai and Shingon) gave way to Pure Land Buddhism, which primarily addressed the people by preaching simple practices of devotion to the Amida Buddha. These very active sects used  intensively during the 13th and 14th centuries to illustrate and disseminate their doctrines.

The religious  of the Kamakura period focus on the foundation of the temples, or the lives of famous monks. During that period, many of the religious institutions commissioned the workshops of painters (often monk-painters) to create  recounting their foundation, or the biography of the founding monk.

The Ippen biography, painted by a monk, remains remarkable for its influences, so far rare, from the Song dynasty (via the wash technique) and the Tang dynasty (the  style), as well as by its very precise representations of forts in many Japanese landscapes.

Towards the middle of the Kamakura period, there was a revival of interest in the Heian court, which already appeared to be a peak of Japanese civilization, and its refined culture.

Muromachi period: decline and 

These are small, symbolic and funny tales, intended to pass the time focusing on mythology, folklore, legends, religious beliefs or even contemporary society. This particular form of  dates back to Heian times, but it was under Muromachi that it gained real popularity.

Various other artists, notably Tawaraya Sōtatsu and Yosa Buson, were still interested in the narrative scroll until around the 17th century.

Features and production of

Themes and genres

 were initially strongly influenced by China, as were the Japanese arts of the time; the  incorporates many of the naive, simple styles of the Tang dynasty, although dissonances can be discerned, especially in relation to colours. From the Heian period onwards,  came to be dissociated from China, mainly in their themes. Chinese scrolls were intended mainly to illustrate the transcendent principles of Buddhism and the serenity of the landscapes, suggesting the grandeur and the spirituality. The Japanese, on the other hand, had refocused their scrolls on everyday life and man, conveying drama, humour and feelings. Thus,  began to be inspired by literature, poetry, nature and especially everyday life; in short, they formed an intimate art, sometimes in opposition to the search for Chinese spiritual greatness.

The first Japanese themes in the Heian period were very closely linked to  literature and poetry: paintings of the seasons, the annual calendar of ceremonies, the countryside and finally the famous landscapes of the Japanese archipelago. Subsequently, the Kamakura warriors and the new Pure Land Buddhist sects diversified the subjects even more widely. Despite the wide range of  themes, specialists like to categorise them, both in substance and in form. An effective method of differentiating  comes back to the study of the subjects by referring to the canons of the time. The categorisation proposed by Okudaira and Fukui thus distinguishes between secular and religious paintings:

Secular paintings

Court novels and diaries dealing with romantic tales, life at court or historical chronicles;
Popular legends;
Military accounts;
Scrolls on  poets;
Reports on the rites and ceremonies celebrated in a very codified and rigid way throughout the year;
Realistic paintings and portraits;
, traditional or fantastic tales popular in the 14th century.

Religious paintings

Illustrations of sutras or religious doctrines;
Illustrated biography of a prominent Buddhist monk or priest (or );
Paintings of the antecedents of a temple;
The , a collection of Buddhist anecdotes.

A third category covers more heterogeneous works, mixing religion and narration or religion and popular humour.

The artists and their audience

Moreover, a scroll can be the fruit of collaboration by several artists; some techniques such as  even naturally incline to such collaboration. Art historians are more interested in determining the social and artistic environment of painters: amateurs or professionals, at court or in temples, aristocrats or of modest birth.

In the first place, amateur painters, perhaps the initiators of the classical , are to be found at the emperor's court in Heian, among the aristocrats versed in the various arts. Period sources mention in particular painting competitions where the nobles competed around a common theme from a poem, as described by Murasaki Shikibu in The Tale of Genji. Their work seems to focus more on the illustration of novels and diaries, rather feminine literature of the court. Monks were also able to produce paintings without any patronage.

The study of certain colophons and period texts makes it possible to associate many  with these professional workshops, and even sometimes to understand how they function.

When produced by the temple workshops,  were intended mainly as proselytism, or to disseminate a doctrine, or even as an act of faith, because copying illustrated sutras must allow communion with the deities (a theory even accredits the idea that the  would have aimed to pacify evil spirits). Proselytising, favoured by the emergence of the Pure Land Buddhist sects during the Kamakura era, changed the methods of  production, because works of proselytism were intended to be copied and disseminated widely in many associated temples, explaining the large number of more or less similar copies on the lives of great monks and the founding of the important temples.

These works were, it seems, intended to be read by nobles. Nevertheless, Seckel and Hasé assert that the separation between the secular and the religious remains unclear and undoubtedly does not correspond to an explicit practice: thus, the aristocrats regularly ordered  to offer them to a temple, and the religious scrolls do not refrain from representing popular things. So, for example, the  presents a rich overview of medieval civilization.

Nevertheless, the life of these artists remains poorly known, at most they seem to be of noble extraction. The  illustrates that point well, as the precision of both religious and aristocratic motifs suggests that the painter is close to those two worlds.

Among the temple workshops, it is known that the Kōzan-ji workshop was particularly prolific, under the leadership of the monk Myōe, a great scholar who brought in many works from Song dynasty China. However, the crucial lack of information and documents on these rare known artists leads Japanese art historians rather to identify styles, workshops, and schools of production.

The Tosa school artists are much better known; Tosa Mitsunobu, for example, produced a large number of works commissioned by temples (including the ) or nobles (including the ).

Materials and manufacture

The paper is traditionally made with the help of women of the Japanese archipelago.

The most famous colors are taken from mineral pigments: for example azurite for blue, vermilion for red, realgar for yellow, malachite for green, amongst others. These thick pigments, named  in Japanese, are not soluble in water and require a thick binder, generally an animal glue; the amount of glue required depends on how finely the pigments have been ground.

As  are intended to be rolled up, the colours must be applied to them in a thin, flat layer in order to avoid any cracking in the medium term, which limits the use of patterns (reliefs) predominant in Western painting. As for the ink, also invented in China around the 1st century CE, it results from a simple mixture of binder and wood smoke, the dosage of which depends on the manufacturer. Essential for calligraphy, it is also important in Asian pictorial arts where the line often takes precedence; Japanese artists apply it with a brush, varying the thickness of the line and the dilution of the ink to produce a colour from a dark black to a pale gray strongly absorbed by the paper.

The lining process simply requires the application of an animal glue which, as it dries, also allows the painted paper or silk to be properly stretched.

Artistic characteristics

General

, a colorful and decorative everyday art, strongly typifies the output of the time. Initially,  mainly designated works with Japanese themes, notably court life, ceremonies or archipelago landscapes, in opposition to the hitherto dominant Chinese scholarly themes, especially during the Nara period. The documents of the 9th century mention, for example, the paintings on sliding walls and screens of the then Imperial Palace, which illustrate  poems. Subsequently, the term  referred more generally to all of the Japanese style paintings created in the 9th century that expressed the sensitivity and character of the people of the archipelago, including those extending beyond the earlier themes. Miyeko Murase thus speaks of "the emergence of national taste".

The style, composition and technique vary greatly, but it is possible to identify major principles. Thus, in relation to style, the Heian period produced a contrast between refined court painting and dynamic painting of subjects outside the court, while the Kamakura period saw a synthesis of the two approaches and the contribution of new realistic influences of the Chinese wash paintings of the Song dynasty. In relation to composition, the artists could alternate calligraphy and painting so as to illustrate only the most striking moments of the story, or else create long painted sections where several scenes blended together and flowed smoothly.

In summary, according to E. Saint-Marc: "We had to build a vocabulary, a syntax, solve a whole series of technical problems, invent a discipline that is both literary and plastic, an aesthetic mode which finds its conventions [...] in turn invented and modelled, frozen by use, then remodelled, to make it an instrument of refined expression."

Styles and techniques

Overview of the Heian period  styles
In the Heian period, these two currents of  also echoed the mysteries and the seclusion of the Imperial Court: the  style thus told what happened inside the court, and the  style spoke of happenings in the populace outside.

Court style: 
The dominant impression of this genre is expressed in Japanese by the term , a kind of fleeting melancholy born from the feeling of the impermanence of things. These works mainly adopted the so-called  (constructed painting) technique, with rich and opaque colours.

A characteristic element of the  resides in the drawing of the faces, very impersonal, that specialists often compare to Noh masks. Indeed, according to the  technique, two or three lines were enough to represent the eyes and the nose in a stylized way; E. Grilli notes the melancholy of this approach. The desired effect is still uncertain, but probably reflects the great restraint of feelings and personalities in the palace, or even allows readers to identify more easily with the characters.

Popular style: 
The style was based on soft lines drawn freely by the artist in ink, unlike  constructed paintings, to favour the impression of movement. The colours generally appeared more muted and left the paper bare in places.

Kamakura period realist painting
Furthermore, the majority of  also transcribed the realistic tendencies of the time, according to the tastes of the warriors in power. The  thus shows in great detail the weapons, armour and uniforms of the soldiers, and the  individually portrays the more than two hundred panicked figures who appear on the section depicting the fire at the door.

Chinese landscape and Song dynasty wash paintings
The  style therefore characterised almost all , and Chinese painting no longer provided the themes and techniques. However, influences were still noticeable in certain works of the Kamakura period, in particular the art, so famous today, of the Song dynasty wash paintings, which was fully demonstrated in the grandiose and deep landscapes sketched in ink, by Ienaga. This last work presents many landscapes typical of Japan according to a perspective and a rigorous realism, with a great economy of colors; various Song pictorial techniques are used to suggest depth, such as birds' flights disappearing on the horizon or the background gradually fading.

Pictorial techniques

technique
The classic  painting technique is called , used especially in most of the works of the  style. A sketch of the outlines was first made in ink before applying the colours flat over the entire surface of the paper using vivid and opaque pigments. The outlines, partly masked by the paint, were finally revived in ink and the small details (such as the hair of the ladies) were enhanced. However, the first sketch was often modified, in particular when the mineral pigments were insoluble in water and therefore required the use of thick glue.

Ink line and monochrome painting
Even though coloured  often occupy a preponderant place, one finds in contrast monochrome paintings in India ink ( or ), according to two approaches. First, ink lines can be extremely free, with the artist laying on paper unconstrained soft gestures that are especially dynamic, as it is mainly the sense of movement that emerges in these works. The painter also plays on the thickness of the brush to accentuate the dynamism, as well as on the dilution of the ink to exploit a wider palette of grey.

The second approach to monochrome paintings is more constructed, with fine, regular strokes sketching a complete and coherent scene, very similar to the first sketch in the  works before the application of the colours; according to some art historians, it is also possible that these  are simply unfinished.

Originally from China, this pictorial technique is now called  ('boneless painting').

Spatial and temporal composition

Transitions between scenes
Originally, in the illustrated sutras, the image was organized in a long, continuous frieze at the top of the scroll, above the texts. That approach, however, was quickly abandoned for a more open layout, of which there are three types:

Alternation between texts and paintings, the former endeavouring to transcribe the illustrations chosen by the artist. Court style paintings often opted for this approach, as paintings more readily focused on important moments or conveyed a narrative.
Intermittence, where the texts appeared only at the beginning or at the end of the scroll, giving pride of place to continuous illustrations ( or ). Sometimes, the texts were even hosted by a separate handscroll.

The balance between texts and images thus varied greatly from one work to another. The author had a broad "syntax of movement and time" which allowed him to adapt the form to the story and to the feelings conveyed. The scrolls with continuous illustrations naturally made the transitions more ambiguous, because each reader can reveal a larger or smaller portion of the paintings, more or less quickly. In the absence of clear separation between scenes, the mode of reading must be suggested in the paintings in order to maintain a certain coherence.

Two kinds of links between scenes were used by the artists. First, there were links by separation using elements of the scenery (traditionally, river, countryside, mist, buildings) were very common. Secondly, the artists used a palette of transitional elements suggested by the figures or the arrangement of objects. Thus, it was not uncommon for characters to point the finger at the following painting or for them to be represented travelling to create the link between two cities, or for the buildings to be oriented to the left to suggest departure and to the right to suggest the arrival. More generally, Bauer identifies the notion of off-screen (the part of painting not yet visible) that the painter must bring without losing coherence.

Perspective and point of view
The space in the composition of an  constitutes a second important instance of the narration over time. As the scroll is usually read from right to left and top to bottom, the authors mainly adopt plunging points of view ('bird's-eye perspective'). However, the low height of the  forces the artist to set up tricks such as the use of long diagonal vanishing lines or sinuous curves suggesting depth. Indoors, it is the architectural elements (beams, partitions, doors) that are used to set up these diagonals; outdoors, the diagonals are set up by the roofs, walls, roads and rivers, arranged on several planes. In  painting there is no real perspective in the Western sense – one that faithfully represents what the eye perceives – but, rather, a parallel or oblique projection.

As mentioned above, scenes are most commonly painted when viewed from above (bird's eye view) in order to maximize the space available for painting, despite the reduced height of the scrolls, while leaving part of the background visible.

In the interior scenes, the simplest technique was developed by from the Chinese Tang artists: only three walls of the room are drawn, in parallel perspective; the point of view is located in the place of the fourth wall, a little higher up. When the need to draw several planes – for example the back of the room or a door open to the next one – arose, the artists proceeded by reducing the size (of the scale).

It was called  (literally, 'roof removed'), and involves not representing the roofs of buildings, and possibly the walls in the foreground if necessary, to enable a depiction of the interior. The genesis of this technique is still little known (it already appears in the biography on wooden panel of Prince Shōtoku), but it already appeared with great mastery on the Court style paintings in the 12th century.

When Kaoru visits Ukifune, while their love is emerging, the artist shows the reader two narrative spaces thanks to the : on the veranda, Kaoru is calm, posed in a peaceful space; inside the building, by contrast, Ukifune and her ladies-in-waiting, are painted on a smaller surface, in turmoil, in a confused composition which reinforces their agitation. More generally, an unrealistic composition (for example from two points of view) makes it possible to suggest strong or sad feelings.

The  technique was also used in a variety of other ways, for example with a very high point of view to reinforce the partitioning of spaces, even in a single room, or by giving the landscape a more important place.

Finally, the scale of an  also makes it possible to suggest depth and guide the arrangement of the elements. In Japanese painting, the scale depends not only on the depth of the scene, but also often on the importance of the elements in the composition or in the story, unlike the realistic renderings in Chinese landscape scrolls. For Saint-Marc, "each element takes [more generally] the importance it has in itself in the painter's mind", freeing itself from the rules of realistic composition.

Narrative rhythm
The narrative rhythm of  arises mainly from the arrangement between texts and images, which constitutes an essential marker of the evolution of the story. By contrast, more dynamic stories play on the alternation between close-ups and wide panoramas, elisions, transitions and exaggeration. In such stories, the narrative rhythm is devoted entirely to the construction of the scroll leading to the dramatic or epic summit, with continuously painted scrolls allowing the action to be revealed as it goes by intensifying the rhythm, and therefore the suspense. The burning of Sanjō Palace in the  illustrates this aspect well, as the artist, by using a very opaque red spreading over almost the entire height of the paper, depicts a gradual intensification of the bloody battles and the pursuit of Emperor Go-Shirakawa until the palace catches fire.

Japanese artists also use other composition techniques to energize a story and set the rhythm: the same characters are represented in a series of varied sets (typically outdoors), a technique known as repetition.

Calligraphy 

In East Asia, calligraphy is a predominant art that aristocrats learn to master from childhood, and styles and arrangements of characters are widely codified, although varied.

The text of an  had more than merely a function of decoration and narration; it could also influence the composition of the paintings. The  have been widely studied on this point: art historians have shown a link between the feeling conveyed by a text and the dominant colour of the accompanying paint, a colour which is also used for the decorated paper. In addition, the composition of the paintings may make it possible to understand them in accordance with the text: for example, the characters in the story may have been painted on a scene in a palace in the order of their appearance in the text. Other specialists in turn have insisted on the importance of the text in the positioning of the paintings, an important point in the Buddhist , in which the transmission of dogmas and religious teachings remained an essential goal of the artist.

A Japanese art

The originality of art is also to be sought in its spirit, "the life of an era translated into formal language". But outside the court, the popular style , the art of everyday life, come closer to the human and universal state of mind.

Historiographical value

Depiction of everyday Japanese life

Sustained production of  through the Heian, Kamakura and Muromachi periods (about 12th–14th centuries) created an invaluable source of information on the then-contemporary Japanese civilization.  have been greatly studied in that respect by historians; no other form of Japanese art has been so intimately linked to the life and culture of the Japanese people.

A large project of the Kanagawa University made a very exhaustive study of the most interesting paintings across fifteen major categories of elements, including dwellings, elements of domestic life and elements of life outside the home, according to ages (children, workers, old people) and social class. Although the main characters are most often nobles, famous monks or warriors, the presence of ordinary people is more or less tangible in an immense majority of works, allowing a study of a very wide variety of daily activities: peasants, craftsmen, merchants, beggars, women, old people and children can appear in turn. The  presents 142 artisans from the Muromachi period, ranging from a blacksmith to a  maker.

Finally, the  offers a unique insight into certain details of the uniforms of police officers (known as ).

The aesthetics, alongside the rendering of people's emotions and expressions of feelings, also show a distinct cleavage between the common people and the aristocracy. For  depicting commoners, emotions such as fear, anguish, excitement and joy are rendered directly and with clarity, whereas aristocratic  instead emphasise refined, but less direct, themes such as classical romance, the holding of ceremonies, and nostalgia for the Heian period.

Historical, cultural and religious reflection
Depending on the subjects addressed,  also form an important historiographical source of information about more than just everyday life, including historical events, culture and religion. By their symbolic importance and the complexity of their codes, these events, as well as some more popular festivals, absorbed much of the energy of the Heian period aristocracy. During the subsequent Kamakura period, the forty-eight scrolls of the  formed an unpublished catalogue of the culture and the society of the time, while recounting, in a proselytising way, the establishment of the first Pure Land school in Japan.

The architecture of the places used as a setting for an  can present a great level of visual detail in relation to period structures. The  thus offers an insight into the  architectural style, marked by a mixture of influence from Tang China and traditional Japan, such as bark roofs. More interesting still, the  details a wide variety of buildings (temples, shrines, palaces, dwellings) taken from life with an unprecedented realism by the painter monk , so that the buildings preserved today are easily recognizable.  can also include various elements of life in the city or in the country, such as the market in the shopping district of Osaka. Another notable example, the  gives a unique sketch of the great Buddha original of Tōdai-ji, which burned in 1180.

 very often take historical or religious events as a source of inspiration: the narrative value of the story (the true story) informs contemporary historians as much about the story as about the way of perceiving this story at the time (there is sometimes a gap of several centuries between the time of the story and the time of the painter). Amongst the most interesting information in an  may be details of the construction of ancient temples, of religious practices and finally of the unfolding of battles and major historical events, such as the Mongol invasions, the Genpei War or even the Ōtenmon political conspiracy.

Notable examples
Art historians, in their writings, have repeatedly emphasized the specific techniques of  art through some characteristic scrolls.

The , dated approximately between the years 1120 and 1140, illustrate The Tale of Genji in the refined and intimate style of the court, but only a few fragments of four scrolls remain today. The scene shown here depicts Prince Genji's final visit to his dying beloved, Lady Murasaki. In the composition, the diagonals reveal the emotion of the characters. First, Lady Murasaki appears at the top right, then the lines guide the eye to the prince in the lower centre, who appears to be crushed by sorrow. Then, the reading continues, and, at left, several months have passed, showing the garden of lovers devastated by time, echoing the loved one lost. The colors are darker than usual.

The most precise estimates place it between 1157 and 1180, and the quality of the descriptions of the temples and the palace suggests that the artist is familiar with both ecclesiastical and aristocratic circles. Myōren, who lived as a hermit in the mountains of Kyoto, used to send a magic bowl by air to the nearby village, in order to receive his offering of rice. One day, a rich merchant became tired of this ritual and locked the bowl in his attic. To punish him, Myōren blew up the whole granary containing the village harvest, as painted in the scene shown here; in that scene, known as the flying granary, the artist fully represents the popular feelings, fear and panic at seeing the harvest disappear. So, this  fits into the  genre, marked by dynamic ink lines, light colors revealing the paper, and themes of everyday life.

The  recounts the historical events of the Heiji rebellion, an episode in the civil war between the Taira and Minamoto clans at the end of the Heian era. Of the numerous original scrolls, formed in the second half of the 13th century, probably over several decades, only three remain, together with various fragments. At the seat of the fire, extremely realistically represented soldiers, equipped with weapons and armor, fight violently, while the aristocrats who try to flee are savagely massacred (here, one is slaughtered by a shaggy soldier).

The twelve scrolls of the  narrate the biography of the holy monk Ippen, founder of the  school of Pure Land Buddhism. They were painted in 1299 by the monk-painter , disciple of Ippen, on silk, probably because of the importance of the character. Ippen, cantor of salvation for all souls and dancing prayers, travelled throughout Japan to transmit his doctrine to men, peasants, townspeople and nobles. The  is renowned for its many strong scenes of landscapes typical of Japan, so realistic that they can still be recognised perfectly today. The scene shown here, in which Ippen and his disciples arrive at Kyoto by the bridge over the Kamo River, illustrates the unique  style, which draws its inspiration from both the classic  realism of Kamakura art and the wash painting of the Song dynasty. The result, so admired by specialists, appears very close to deep and spiritual Chinese landscapes with rough ink strokes, while retaining a Japanese iconography through the freedom taken with perspective (the characters in particular are disproportionate) and the elements of daily life.

The , painted around 1218–1230, illustrates the legend of two Korean monks who founded the Kegon sect in their country in the 12th century. One of them, Gishō, made a pilgrimage to China in his youth to complete his Buddhist education. There, he met a young Chinese girl, Zenmyō, who fell in love with him. Alas, on the day he was due to depart, the latter arrived late at the port and, in despair, rushed into the water, swearing to protect her beloved forever. She then transformed into a dragon and became a protective deity of the Kegon school, according to legend. The well-known scene shown here, in which Zenmyō, transformed into a dragon, carries Gishō's ship on her back, features supple and fine lines as well as discreet colors that do not mask the brushstrokes; this style also seems inspired by the wash painting of the Song dynasty to which the very Japanese sensitivity for colors has been added. In fact, the sponsor of the roll, the monk Myōe of Kōzan-ji, appreciated the art of the Asian continent and brought to Japan several contemporary Chinese works, which probably inspired the artists of his painting workshop.

The scrolls were actually intended for the Shinto shrine of Kitano Tenmangū in Kyoto; the last two of eight scrolls narrate the foundation and miracles. However, the thematic division of the work appears unfinished, the sketch of a ninth scroll having been brought to light. In the scene shown here, Michizane, unjustly condemned to exile, calls out to the gods in his misfortune. The composition of the painting testifies to a very Japanese sensitivity; Michizane is disproportionately depicted to underline his grandeur and determination in the face of dishonour, while the vividly colored and almost contourless landscape is imbued with Shinto animism.

See also
 Cantastoria
 
 
 Moving panorama
 
 List of National Treasures of Japan (paintings)

References

Notes

Citations

Bibliography

Journal articles and conference proceedings

Works specialising in

Works focusing on a specific

General books on the art of Japan

External links

Emakimono
Buddhist art
Entertainment in Japan
History of art in Japan
Illustration
Japanese art terminology
Japanese chronicles
Monogatari
Japanese words and phrases